Burlington Center was a shopping mall located in Burlington Township, New Jersey. It was built by The Rouse Company of Columbia, Maryland. Its anchors were Macy's, JCPenney, and Sears.

The mall closed on January 8, 2018, with only Sears remaining open until its closure on September 2, 2018. Demolition of the mall began in early 2021.

History
Burlington Center mall opened in 1982 and was developed by The Rouse Company. The opening of Burlington Center mall in 1982 on the formerly rural corridor along County Route 541, has been credited as the trigger of a development boom on the stretch between Burlington Township and Mount Holly Township. JCPenney opened a  store in August 1996 as an addition to the existing Strawbridge's and Sears stores. Jager Management acquired the mall in November 1999 for $10.5 million. Strawbridge's, a longtime anchor at the mall, was converted to a Macy's store as of September 9, 2006. At its peak, the mall had 3 anchor stores and 100 smaller stores and restaurants.

Decline and redevelopment
In recent years, The Burlington Center mall saw an increase in the vacancy rate with few national chains remaining in the mall. In January 2010, Macy's announced that its Burlington Center location would close by March 2010. In June 2012, the mall was sold at auction to Moonbeam Equities for $4.4 million. In 2014, JCPenney left the mall as part of the chain's round of closures affecting 33 locations nationwide, leaving Sears as the only anchor store at the mall.

In 2014, the mall announced plans for redevelopment that would demolish the former Macy's and JCPenney and replace it with an outdoor shopping area. Construction was expected to begin by the summer of 2016, but work was delayed as a result of lease renegotiations with Sears, a primary property holder. Throughout 2017, the mall continued to decline. By summer 2017, only a few stores were left at the mall, including a food pantry, arcade, Bath & Body Works, and Foot Locker. The food court was completely vacant and portions of the parking lot were overgrown with weeds. As of the 2017 Christmas season, two non-profits were asked to leave the mall by December 22.

The mall voluntarily closed on January 8, 2018 due to extensive damage from a burst water pipe, after originally planning to close in March 2018.  The Sears store located on the property, which was under separate ownership than the rest of the mall, remained open. On May 31, 2018, it was announced that Sears would be closing in September 2018 as part of a plan to close 72 stores nationwide, leaving the mall entirely without tenants. In January 2019, Clarion Partners LLC was moving ahead with plans to acquire the former mall from Moonbeam Capital Investments LLC and demolish it for an industrial development. OClario Partners purchased the mall for $22 million. On February 1, 2019, a large bronze elephant named Petal that had been in the mall since 1982 was moved out of the closed mall and was relocated to the Burlington Riverwalk.

In November, 2019, a new proposal was introduced for the redevelopment of the mall, including retail, restaurants, 400 to 500 housing units and several large warehouses. Following the demolition of the mall in 2021, construction on a warehouse on the former site of the mall began in 2022.

Controversy
The mall was closed early on January 13, 2007, due to gang-related violence that may have involved 20 individuals connected with the Bloods and the Next Level Gang (considered a stepping stone to the Crips).

Former anchors
Mall anchors included:
Sears – , (opened August 2, 1982; closed September 2, 2018)
Macy's –  (originally Strawbridge & Clothier; closed 2010)
JCPenney –  (opened 1996; closed 2014)

Location
The mall was located on Mount Holly Road (County Route 541), between Interstate 295 (exits 47A/B) and the New Jersey Turnpike (exit 5).

References

External links

Moonbeam Capital Investments

Buildings and structures in Burlington County, New Jersey
Shopping malls in New Jersey
Shopping malls established in 1982
Shopping malls disestablished in 2018
Tourist attractions in Burlington County, New Jersey
Burlington Township, New Jersey
Defunct shopping malls in the United States
Demolished shopping malls in the United States
1982 establishments in New Jersey
2018 disestablishments in New Jersey